Standings and results for Group F of the UEFA Euro 2008 qualifying tournament.

Spain secured qualification to the tournament proper on 17 November 2007 following a 3–0 win against Sweden, becoming the tenth team in the whole of the qualification stage to do so. Sweden secured qualification to the tournament proper on 21 November 2007 following a 2–1 win against Latvia, becoming the eleventh team in the whole of the qualification stage to do so.

Standings

Matches 
Group F fixtures were settled at a meeting between the participants in Copenhagen, Denmark.

Goalscorers

Notes

References

External links
UEFA website

Group F
2006 in Swedish football
2007 in Swedish football
Sweden at UEFA Euro 2008
2006–07 in Northern Ireland association football
2007–08 in Northern Ireland association football
2006–07 in Spanish football
qual
2006 in Latvian football
2007 in Latvian football
2006–07 in Danish football
2006 in Icelandic football
2007 in Icelandic football
2006–07 in Liechtenstein football
2007–08 in Liechtenstein football
Denmark–Sweden football rivalry